The 1900 United States presidential election in New Jersey took place on November 6, 1900. Voters chose ten representatives, or electors to the Electoral College, who voted for president and vice president.

New Jersey overwhelmingly voted for the Republican nominee, President William McKinley, over the Democratic nominee, former U.S. Representative and 1896 Democratic presidential nominee William Jennings Bryan. McKinley won New Jersey by a margin of 14.17 points in this rematch of the 1896 presidential election. The return of economic prosperity and recent victory in the Spanish–American War helped McKinley to score a decisive victory.

Results

Results by county

References

New Jersey
1900
1900 New Jersey elections